Arthur Herbert Watson (b Bootle, Cumberland 15 May 1864; d Keswick, Cumberland 13 July 1952) was Archdeacon of Richmond from 1921 until 1937.

Watson was educated at Marlborough College and The Queen's College, Oxford. Watson was ordained in 1890. After a curacy at Beeston Hill he was a Chaplain to the Forces in Natal then Vicar of St Peter, Maritzburg. He held further incumbencies at Ovingham, Long Preston and Kirkby Wiske. He was a Canon Residentiary of Ripon Cathedral from 1922 until 1937.

References

Archdeacons of Richmond
20th-century English Anglican priests
People educated at Marlborough College
Alumni of The Queen's College, Oxford
People from Bootle, Cumbria
1864 births
1952 deaths